= HD 197036 =

Star in the constellation Cygnus

Observation data Epoch J2000.0 Equinox ICRS
- Constellation: Cygnus
- Right ascension: 20^{h} 39^{m} 23.1274^{s}
- Declination: +45° 40′ 00.9405″
- Apparent magnitude (V): 6.61±0.01

Characteristics
- Evolutionary stage: main sequence
- Spectral type: B5 IV
- U−B color index: −0.59
- B−V color index: −0.07

Astrometry
Radial velocity (R_{v})	−15±2 km/s
Proper motion (μ)	RA: +3.737 mas/yr Dec.: −1.586 mas/yr
Parallax (π)	2.4923±0.0284 mas
Distance	1,310 ± 10 ly (401 ± 5 pc)
Absolute magnitude (M_{V})	−1.15

Details
Mass	4.21 M_{☉}
Radius	5.17 R_{☉}
Luminosity	379 L_{☉}
Surface gravity (log g)	3.52 cgs
Temperature	13,399 K
Metallicity [Fe/H]	−0.03 dex
Rotational velocity (v sin i)	135 km/s

Other designations
- BD+45°3233, GC 28793, HD 197036, HIP 101934, HR 7912, SAO 49898, GSC 03574-03107

Database references
SIMBAD	data

HD 197036 is a single star in the northern constellation Cygnus. It has an absolute magnitude of −1.15 and an apparent magnitude of 6.61, below the max naked eye visibility. Located 1,310 light years away, it is approaching Earth with a heliocentric radial velocity of −15 km/s.

HD 197036 is a bluish white subgiant star of the spectral type B5IV, and has an angular diameter of 0.12 mas. This yields a radius of 5.17 R_{☉} at its estimated distance. At present it has 4.21 times the mass of the Sun and shines at 379 times the luminosity of the Sun from its photosphere at an effective temperature of 13,399 K, giving it a bluish white hue. Like many hot stars, it spins rapidly with a projected rotational velocity of 135 km/s^{−1} and has a near solar metallicity.
